The Agapia Monastery is a Romanian Orthodox nunnery located 9 km west of Târgu Neamț, in the commune of Agapia, Neamț County. It was built between 1641 and 1643 by Romanian hetman Gavriil Coci, brother of Vasile Lupu. The church, restored and modified several times during the centuries was painted by Nicolae Grigorescu between 1858 and 1861. It is one of the largest nunneries in Romania, having 300–400 nuns and ranking second place in population after Văratec Monastery.

References

External links

Romanian Orthodox monasteries of Neamț County
Christian monasteries established in the 17th century
17th-century establishments in Romania
1643 establishments in Romania
Historic monuments in Neamț County
17th-century architecture in Romania